The 1877 Dublin University by-election was fought on 13 February 1877. The by-election was held due to the incumbent Conservative MP, Edward Gibson, becoming Attorney-General for Ireland. It was retained by the incumbent.

References

1877 elections in the United Kingdom
February 1877 events
By-elections to the Parliament of the United Kingdom in Dublin University
Unopposed ministerial by-elections to the Parliament of the United Kingdom (need citation)
1877 elections in Ireland